Julia Richter (born 29 September 1988 in Schwedt) is a German rower.

She was part of the German quadruple sculls team that won a silver medal at the 2012 Summer Olympics.

She, Tina Manker, Stephanie Schiller and Britta Oppelt won the gold medal at the 2011 World Championship, and she, Annekatrin Thiele, Carina Bär and Britta Oppelt won the quadruple sculls at the 2013 World Championships.  Her team with Oppelt, Bär and Manker won bronze in 2010.

At European level, she was part of the women's quadruple sculls team that won gold in 2013, silver in 2010 and 2014 and bronze in 2007.

References

External links
 

1988 births
Living people
Sportspeople from Schwedt
People from Bezirk Frankfurt
German female rowers
Olympic rowers of Germany
Rowers at the 2012 Summer Olympics
Olympic silver medalists for Germany
Olympic medalists in rowing
Medalists at the 2012 Summer Olympics
World Rowing Championships medalists for Germany
European Rowing Championships medalists
21st-century German women